"La bambola" (Italian for "The Doll") is an Italian pop song written by Franco Migliacci, Ruggero Cini and Bruno Zambrini, and performed by Patty Pravo. The song had been previously refused by several artists, including Gianni Morandi, Little Tony, Gigliola Cinquetti, Caterina Caselli and The Rokes.

The single peaked at the first place for nine consecutive weeks between May and June 1968 on the Italian chart and was certified gold. It is considered as the song which definitely consecrated Pravo to fame. The B-side of the single is "Se c'è l'amore" ("If There Is Love"), a cover of Long John Baldry's "Let the Heartaches Begin". A Spanish-language version of the song was released in Spain.
 
The song was later covered by several artists, including Dalida, Heidi Brühl, Anita Lindblom, Giusy Ferreri, Fredi, Felicia Weathers, Sara Lov, Sergio Dalma, Olé Olé, Tamara Miansarova and Ivan Cattaneo. It was also used in several films, notably Anton Corbijn's The American, Michele Placido's Romanzo Criminale, Emanuele Crialese's Respiro and Bigas Luna's Bambola. To commemorate the fortieth anniversary of the hit, the singer released a new version of the song, "La bambola 2008".

Track listing
7" single
A. "La bambola" (Franco Migliacci, Ruggero Cini, Bruno Zambrini) – 3:08
B. "Se c'è l'amore" (Tony Macaulay, John Macleod, Franco Migliacci) – 3:02

7" single (Spain)
A. "La bambola" (Franco Migliacci, Ruggero Cini, Bruno Zambrini, Cholo Baltasar) – 3:08
B. "Lettera a Gianni (Carta a Gianni)" (Sergio Bardotti, Shel Shapiro) – 2:08

Charts

Weekly charts

Year-end charts

References

1968 singles
1968 songs
Anita Lindblom songs
Italian songs
Number-one singles in Italy
Patty Pravo songs
Songs with lyrics by Franco Migliacci
Songs with music by Ruggero Cini